Planososibia is a genus of Asian stick insects in the tribe Necrosciini, erected by Francis Seow-Choen in 2016.  Species have been recorded from: Sri Lanka, Tibet, China, Vietnam and Malesia.

Species
The Phasmida Species File lists:
 Planososibia biaculeata (Redtenbacher, 1908)
 Planososibia bimai Seow-Choen, 2020
 Planososibia brevialata Ho, 2017
 Planososibia chini Seow-Choen, 2021
 Planososibia cornuta (Chen & He, 2008)
 Planososibia cpae Seow-Choen, 2017
 Planososibia emileenae Seow-Choen, 2017
 Planososibia esacus (Westwood, 1859) - type species (as Necroscia esacus Westwood)
 Planososibia humbertiana (Saussure, 1868)
 Planososibia kotalensis Seow-Choen, 2017
 Planososibia leusera Seow-Choen, 2018
 Planososibia liui Ho, 2017
 Planososibia lysippus (Westwood, 1859)
 Planososibia nigricans (Redtenbacher, 1908)
 Planososibia paraesalus (Redtenbacher, 1908)
 Planososibia parvipennis (Stål, 1877)
 Planososibia platycerca (Redtenbacher, 1908)
 Planososibia qiongensis (Ho, 2013)
 Planososibia siewtei Seow-Choen, 2017
 Planososibia subulussalama Seow-Choen, 2018
 Planososibia tommykohi Seow-Choen, 2017
 Planososibia truncata (Chen & Chen, 2000)
 Planososibia trusmadiensis Seow-Choen, 2017
 Planososibia yunnana (Chen & He, 2008)
 Planososibia zackyi Seow-Choen, 2018

References

External links

Phasmatodea genera
Phasmatodea of Asia
Lonchodidae